The Makira cicadabird (Edolisoma salomonis) is a species of bird in the family Campephagidae.
It is endemic to the Solomon Islands.  It used to be considered a subspecies of the common cicadabird.

Its natural habitats are subtropical or tropical moist lowland forest and subtropical or tropical moist montane forest.

References

Makira cicadabird
Birds of Makira
Makira cicadabird